Zhang Jingna (born 4 May 1988 in Beijing) is a Chinese-born Singaporean photographer widely known as "zemotion." Her works have appeared on multiple editions of Vogue, Elle and Harper's Bazaar. She was named on the Forbes 30 Under 30 Asia list 2018.

Biography

Early life
Zhang was born in the suburbs of Beijing to a sporting family. She moved to Singapore at the age of 8, where she attended Haig Girls' School.

Air rifle 
At the age of fourteen, Zhang enrolled in Raffles Girls' School, where she began training in air rifle. She broke her first national record after nine months and subsequently joined the national team. She was active in the team for six years.

Zhang's notable achievements within the sport include breaking a record in the 10m Air Rifle event at the Commonwealth Shooting Championships 2005 in Melbourne, and a bronze in the same event at the Commonwealth Games in 2006. She was awarded Sports Girl of the Year 2006 by the Singapore National Olympic Council for her performances.

Art school and photography 
Zhang declined the option to go on to junior college for A Levels and pursued a degree in fashion design at LASALLE College of the Arts.
She picked up photography there as a hobby when she was eighteen. Probably due to her keen interest and achievements with the medium, she left Lasalle and the national team to pursue photography full-time in 2008.

Zhang's clientele since then include Mercedes Benz, Canon, Pond's, Ogilvy & Mather Advertising and Wacom. She also produced fashion editorials for magazines such as Vogue, Harper's Bazaar, and Elle.

In fall 2008, Zhang held her first solo exhibition, "Something Beautiful", at The Arts House in Singapore. In 2010, 50 of her works were showcased along Orchard Road during Singapore's fashion festival – Fashion Seasons @ Orchard. It was Singapore's first large scale street exhibition featuring fashion photography.

In late 2010, Zhang announced her second gallery exhibition, "Angel Dreams". The show was held at Japan Creative Centre in Singapore with the support of Embassy of Japan. The event was noted for her photographs of Japanese musician Sugizo (Luna Sea, X Japan).

In 2013 she was selected to be part of Vogue Italia's "A Glimpse at Photo Vogue" exhibition at Galleria Carla Sozzani in Milan.

Zhang is influenced by people such as Peter Lindbergh, John William Waterhouse, Yoshitaka Amano and Zdzisław Beksiński. She also cites her friend Kuang Hong, a fellow artist, as one of the influences to her early artistic development.

In 2013 Zhang started a personal project entitled  "Motherland Chronicles". With the project she sought to explore subjects she loved during her childhood, including themes from anime, manga, and Japanese fantasy art. The project is intended for publication as an art book in 2014.

Collaborations, other interests 
Zhang photographed Sugizo multiple times in 2009 and 2010. She also shot his band Luna Sea's 20th Anniversary World Tour Reboot concert at the Tokyo Dome in 2010. Her photographs of Sugizo from the collaborations and concerts are collected in his book Ongaku ni ai sareta otoko: Sono haran no hansei, the cover features an image from their first collaboration in Japan.

In 2011 Zhang photographed Korean celebrity Rain for Anchor Beer's campaign in Seoul.

Zhang also worked with cosplayer Alodia Gosiengfiao. They collaborated on a tribute piece to Japanese artist and illustrator Yoshitaka Amano.

From 2011–2013, Zhang owned and managed a semi-professional Starcraft 2 team called Infinity Seven.

Career 
In 2021, Zhang announced that she decided to quit fashion photography, citing racism within the Western market. In posts uploaded to Facebook and Instagram, Zhang stated that her experiences with racism and xenophobia had prompted her to leave the industry.

In 2022, her portraits of actress Michelle Yeoh were featured for Time magazine's 100 Most Influential People and the cover photos for a profile for The Hollywood Reporter.

In May 2022, Jingna was alerted by Luxembourgish fans about possible and blatant copyright infringement of her work. Jeff Dieschburg claimed her work delivered for Harper's Bazaar Vietnam in 2017 as his own, using it for financial profit and media recognition. Strassen Biennial of Contemporary Art art competition in Luxembourg rewarded him with a prize 1500€ and proceeded to auction the "item" in question for 6500€ in June 2022. News outlets noted the "obvious similarities" while Dieschburg justified the use of his work, claiming it as "inspiration."

Awards 
2006 Sportsgirl of the Year, Singapore Sports Award, Singapore
2007 Master Photographer of the Year, Singapore Master Photographer Print Competition, Singapore
2008 Overseas Fashion & Press Photographer of the Year, British Professional Photography Awards, Newcastle, UK
2009 3rd Place Advertising: Catalogue, International Photography Awards
2009 3rd Place Fine Art: Nudes, International Photography Awards
2011 Photographer of the Year, Elle Awards, Singapore
2012 Honorable Mention in Fine Art: Portraits, Fine Art: Nudes, and Advertising: Fashion, International Photography Awards
2013 Best Beauty/Glamor Photographer, FRAMED Awards, Las Vegas, USA
2013 Young Photographer of the Year, Mobius Awards
2015 Recipient, 7th Julia Margaret Cameron Award for Women Photographers
2017 Gold, Portraiture, Px3 Prix de la Photographie, Paris
2018 Forbes 30 Under 30 Asia, Arts

Exhibitions

Solo exhibitions 
2008 Something Beautiful, The Arts House, Singapore, 2008
2010 Fashion Season @ Orchard Street Exhibition, Orchard Road, Singapore, 2010
2010 Angel Dreams, Japan Creative Center, Singapore, 2010
2017 PURE, Hjo Culture Center, Sweden

Group exhibitions 
2013 Vogue Italia: "A Glimpse at Photo Vogue", Galleria Carla Sozzani, Milan, 2013

Books
 Zhang Jingna Postcard Collection (2009)
 Something Beautiful (2008)

References

External links 
 
 Zhang Jingna's Interview with Beta Pixel

1988 births
Living people
Chinese photographers
Singaporean photographers
Artists from Beijing
Chinese women photographers
Singaporean women photographers
Raffles Girls' Secondary School alumni